Callionymus izuensis, the Izu dragonet, is a species of dragonet which is endemic to the waters around the Izu Islands of Japan. It was originally described as a subspecies of Callionymus persicus from the western Indian Ocean and has also been placed in the genus Calliurichthys by some authorities.

References

I
Fish described in 1993